Harry Woods (1863 – October 12, 1914) was an American politician and businessman.

Born in Canada, Woods emigrated to the United States in 1877 and settled in Chicago, Illinois. Woods was a messenger and then, in 1890, worked in the grain trade business. From 1913 until his death in 1914, Woods served as Illinois Secretary of State and was a Democrat. In 1914, he unsuccessfully ran for U.S. Senate. Woods committed suicide in his garage, at his home, with a shotgun.

Notes

1863 births
1914 deaths
Canadian emigrants to the United States
Businesspeople from Chicago
Politicians from Chicago
Illinois Democrats
Secretaries of State of Illinois
American politicians who committed suicide
Suicides by firearm in Illinois
19th-century American politicians
19th-century American businesspeople